Ethiopian Airlines is the flag carrier of Ethiopia; it was founded as Ethiopian Air Lines on 21 December 1945. The carrier started operations on 8 April 1946, and the first scheduled destination served was Cairo via Asmara using Douglas C-47 Skytrain equipment.

The airline's hub is located at Addis Ababa Bole International Airport. Following is a list Ethiopian Airlines' scheduled destinations. Each destination in the list below is provided with the country name, the name of the airport served, and whether it is served by passenger aircraft, cargo aircraft, or both. Terminated destinations are also listed.

List
Ethiopian Airlines flies to the following destinations, :

See also

 Transport in Ethiopia

Notes

Citations

Bibliography

External links
 
 
 
 
 
 

Ethiopian Airlines
Ethiopian Airlines
Ethiopian Airlines